Hulja is a small town in Kadrina Parish, Lääne-Viru County in northern Estonia.

The population was 477 on December 31, 2011.

The biggest local company is Aru Grupp with four factories and about 180 employees in Hulja.

Gallery

References

External links 
Satellite map at Maplandia.com

Boroughs and small boroughs in Estonia
Kreis Wierland